The Aragonese cuisine includes several typical dishes and ingredients of the local cuisine of Aragon, a community in Spain.

Dishes and ingredients
One of the most characteristic dishes of the traditional gastronomy of Aragon is roast lamb (prepared especially with ewes), known as ternasco. Salted cod imported from other parts of Spain was also traditionally used in some dishes such as in the Albóndigas de bacalao.

Some of the most well-known main ingredients include ham (jamón) from Teruel, olive oil from Empeltre and Arbequina olives, sweet varieties of onion, and unusual vegetables such as borage and cardoon.

Sweet Aragonese specialities are the trenza de Almudevar, the tortas de alma, guirlache (a type of nougat), adoquines, frutas de Aragón (a confit of fruit covered in chocolate) and Españoletas (a kind of local cookie).

Breads 
 Pan de cinta
 Pan de pintera, pintadera or estrella
 Pan de cañada (bread with olive oil)
 Pan de San Jorge (Saint George bread)
 Regañao (pizza-like bread)
 Trenza (braided sweetbread)
 Culeca
 Torta de cañamones
 Chusco
 Pan dormido

Wines
The best-known wines of Aragon are those from Cariñena, Somontano (Huesca), Calatayud and Campo de Borja.

References

External links

 Take a taste of Aragon

 
Aragonese culture
Spanish cuisine
Spanish cuisine by autonomous community